Hate on Trial: The Case Against America's Most Dangerous Neo-Nazi is a book by Morris Dees and Steve Fiffer recounting the civil trial of Berhanu v. Metzger in which the Southern Poverty Law Center and Anti-Defamation League sued Tom Metzger and White Aryan Resistance.

The SPLC and ADL successfully argued that Meztger's organization was civilly liable for the murder of Mulugeta Seraw receiving a $12.5 million judgement.

According to the New York Times book review, "the descriptions of the people involved are well wrought, and a moral quest fuels this book with driving power."

Versions
Morris Dees and Steve Fiffer. Hate on Trial: The Case Against America's Most Dangerous Neo-Nazi. Villard, (February 23, 1993)  (280 pages)
PBS TV Special with Bill Moyers. "Hate on Trial with Bill Moyers" (1992)

References

External links
Berhanu v. Metzger case document of Southern Poverty Law Center

1993 non-fiction books
Law books
Villard (imprint) books